The R750 road is a regional road in County Wicklow, Ireland. From its junction with the R772 in Rathnew on the outskirts of Wicklow Town it takes a generally southerly route to its junction with the R772 in Ferrybank in Arklow, where it terminates. 

An unusual feature of the road (apart from the complete absence of road markings) is a section of several kilometres with a concrete surface south of Brittas Bay. 

En route it stays close to the coast passing many popular beaches, notably at Brittas Bay.

See also
Roads in Ireland

References

Roads Act 1993 (Classification of Regional Roads) Order 2006 – Department of Transport

Regional roads in the Republic of Ireland
Roads in County Wicklow